Twenty20 is a crowd-sourced stock photography marketplace founded in 2014 by Matt Munson, Todd Emaus, and Kevin Fremon.  It is headquartered in Marina Del Rey, CA, United States. Twenty20 maintains a library of over 45 million royalty-free stock photos.

History 
The company was initially founded in April 2013 as Instacanvas, a service to print Instagram photographs on canvas.  In October 2013, it rebranded itself as Twenty20, changing its focus to become a crowdsourced stock photography marketplace for social media advertising campaigns.  Along with Series A round funding, they announced in February 2015 they had over 45 million photographs.  The service ended its beta test in March 2015.  The company handles legal issues in-house and focuses on authenticity, which they have cited as desirable to millennials.  Joining is free for photographers, who share the revenue with Twenty20.  Twenty20 offers both à la carte and subscription-based access to advertisers.  ABC News described the most popular images as those that "show healthy lifestyles, modern workplaces and scenes from everyday life". Purchased by Envato Elements in 2019, it was shutdown by them July 31, 2022.

References

External links 
 

Companies based in Los Angeles
American companies established in 2014
Internet properties established in 2014
Mass media companies established in 2014
Photo archives in the United States
American photography websites
Stock photography